The 1978 Harlow District Council election took place on 4 May 1978 to elect members of Harlow District Council in Essex, England. This was on the same day as other local elections. The Labour Party retained control of the council.

Election result

Ward results

Brays Grove

Hare Street and Town Centre

Katherines With Sumner

Kingsmoor

Latton Bush

Little Parndon

Mark Hall North

Mark Hall South

Netteswell West

Old Harlow

Passmores

Potter Street

Stewards

Tye Green

References

1978
1978 English local elections
1970s in Essex